St. Gereon may refer to:

 Gereon, or Saint Gereon of Köln, who may have been a soldier, martyred at Cologne by beheading, probably in the early 4th century
 St. Gereon's Basilica, Cologne, a Roman Catholic church in Cologne, Germany, dedicated to Saint Gereon